Teun van de Keuken (born 1971) is a Dutch producer of television and radio programs who established a reputation investigating fair trade and production practices in the food industry; he founded the chocolate company Tony's Chocolonely. He debuted in 2017 as a novelist.

Biography

Television and investigative journalism
Van de Keuken was born to strongly left-wing parents (his father was documentary filmmaker Johan van der Keuken), and referred to the environment in his parents' house as a "secular Calvinism". He became known for the program Keuringsdienst van waarde, which focused on problems in food production, including slavery and child labor. Research for this show led him to focus on chocolate. He sought publicity and a verdict by the courts on slave labor by eating chocolate bars made with slave labor, and asking to be arrested as an accessory to the crime of employing child slaves. In the end he created what he called "slave-free chocolate", manufactured following fair trade conventions, under the brand Tony's Chocolonely. In 2011, 51% of the company was bought by businessman Henk Jan Beltman. In a 2016 documentary about him called Tony, Van de Keuken said that it was all to no avail, that slave labor still was part of the manufacturing chain; Beltman accepted that as a challenge to continue the struggle against slavery in the cocoa trade.

He made other investigative journalistic productions such as De slag om Brussel and De slag om Nederland, and in 2014 published a collection of articles on food, food production, and certification marks. Since 2015 he has presented De Monitor, an investigative journalism program.

Authorship
Also a columnist since the mid-2000s, he published his first novel, Goed Volk ("Good people"), in 2017. The book, partially  autobiographical, deals with growing up in Amsterdam and attending public schools; the author's parents made a point of sending him to schools attended by lower-class children, where he felt like an outsider and was used as a political statement. Johan van der Keuken is not mentioned by name, though the first-person narrator is called "Teun". Vrij Nederland called the novel "semi-autobiographical" and qualified it as a coming of age novel, in which the narrator develops from being deeply ashamed of his parents and particularly his father to appreciating him as a man with good intentions.

References

Living people
1971 births
Dutch television producers
Dutch radio producers
21st-century Dutch novelists
Dutch television presenters
21st-century Dutch businesspeople
Dutch columnists
Mass media people from Amsterdam
Dutch male novelists
21st-century Dutch male writers